Deltron 3030 is the debut album by the hip hop supergroup of the same name: rapper Del the Funky Homosapien, producer Dan the Automator, and DJ Kid Koala. It was released on May 23, 2000, by 75 Ark. The album was reissued on July 1, 2008 with 3 bonus remixes. The album's cover features a photograph of the Perisphere, a structure constructed for the 1939 New York World's Fair.

It is a rap opera concept album set in a dystopian year 3030. The album's story casts Del in the role of Deltron Zero, a disillusioned mech soldier and interplanetary computer prodigy rebelling against a 31st-century New World Order. In a world where evil oligarchs suppress both human rights and hip-hop, Del fights rap battles against a series of foes, becoming Galactic Rhyme Federation Champion. Del the Funky Homosapien's lyrics veer from serious social commentary to humor to epic sci-fi battles, while producer Dan the Automator creates an eerie and dense atmosphere.

The song "3030" was used as the theme song on the short-lived CBS series Robbery Homicide Division.

Track listing

Samples 
The following lists some of the songs and sounds sampled for Deltron 3030.

 "State of the Nation"
"Phalene" by Placebo

 "3030"
"And That's Saying a Lot" by Christine McVie
"Introit" by William Sheller

 "Things You Can Do"
"What Can The Matter Be?" by The Poppy Family

 "Positive Contact"
"No Silver Bird" by The Hooterville Trolley
"Days of the Week" by Matt Robinson
"Stakes Is High" by De La Soul
"Worldwide" by Del the Funky Homosapien
Airplane!
Battlestar Galactica
The Black Hole

 "Virus"
"Atlantis" by Release Music Orchestra
The Black Hole

 "Mastermind"
"Alguien," by Johnny Olivo
"Dirty Feet" by the Daly-Wilson Big Band
"Loud, Loud, Loud" by Aphrodite's Child
"Magnetizing"  by Handsome Boy Modeling School

 "National Movie Review"
"Atlantis" by Les Baxter

 "Madness"
"Of Cities and Escapes" by The Poppy Family
"Wack MCs" by Del the Funky Homosapien

 "Turbulence"
Various tracks from the soundtrack of Fantastic Planet by Alain Goraguer

 "The News (A Wholly Owned Subsidiary of Microsoft Inc.)"
"And That's Saying a Lot" by Christine McVie
"Chapala" by Vicente Fernández

 "Love Story"
"Milk and Honey" by Bonnie Dobson
"Le Massacre Du Dragon" by the Maurice Vander Trio

 "Memory Loss"
"Catch a Bad One" by Del the Funky Homosapien

Personnel 

Mark Bell – remixing
V. Brown – vocals
Dan the Automator – producer
Del the Funky Homosapien – vocals, lyricist
Scott Harding – engineer
Kid Koala – DJ
Aaron Bruno - vocals
Sean Lennon – vocals
Money Mark – vocals
Brad Roberts – vocals
P. Wingerter – vocals
Damon Albarn - vocals, narration, melodica, additional instrumentation

Charts

Legacy
In the Cartoon Network series Craig of the Creek, the episode "The Kid From 3030" has Craig and his friends encounter a boy (voiced by Del) who states that his name is Deltron and that he is from the year 3030. He wears a cassette player on his chest that reads "Automator".

References 

2000 debut albums
Deltron 3030 albums
Albums produced by Dan the Automator
Concept albums
Science fiction concept albums
Rap operas
Dystopian music
75 Ark albums